Qasid may refer to:

 Qasid subtribe of the Yemeni tribe Yafa
 Qasid Dynasty (1144-1151 CE) of the Iberian Moorish Taifa of Mértola
 Qaṣīd, a type of Jewish poetry written in Arabic from Yemen
 Qased, an Iranian LV

See also

 قاصد (disambiguation)
 Qased (disambiguation); including
 Ghased (disambiguation); including
 Courier